Hugh Brooks Mendez (1935 – 2013) was an American football and baseball player and coach. He served as the head baseball coach at Whittier College in Whittier, California from 1971 to 1987. He also served as Whittier's head football coach from 1980 to 1989, winning two conference championships

Hugh B.Mendez stadium was dedicated in his honor by Whittier College in 2018.  Mendez was also inducted to the Whittier College Athletic Hall of Fame.

Overseas Europe
Mendez coached American football for well over a decade from the mid-1980s, 1990's into the early 2000s in several European countries including teams in the Austrian Football League, German Football League, Finland Vaahteraliiga, and in the Italian Football League.

The legendary Mendez won league championships as a head coach in multiple countries including, the 1993 Austrian Bowl title, the 1985 Finnish Maple Bowl Vaahteraliiga, and won the first Eurobowl championship in 1986 with Taft Vantaa from Finland.

Mendez also conducted coaching clinics throughout Europe, and wrote coaching books and manuals.

Head coaching record

Notes

References

External links

1935 births
2013 deaths
American football halfbacks
Baseball pitchers
McCook Braves players
Springfield Pride baseball players
Springfield Pride football players
Whittier Poets baseball coaches
Whittier Poets football coaches
Yakima Braves players
American expatriate sportspeople in Austria
American expatriate players of American football
American expatriate sportspeople in Germany
American expatriate sportspeople in Finland
American expatriate sportspeople in Italy